Dwesa-Cwebe Nature Reserve is a nature reserve in the Eastern Cape Province, South Africa that is managed by Eastern Cape Parks & Tourism Agency.

On one side, the reserve is surrounded by the Indian Ocean, and on the other by the rugged pastures of the former Transkei.

About 290 species of birds have been recorded in the park.

From the top of Kobole Point, there are magnificent views across the ocean.

History 
The Dwesa-Cwebe Nature Reserve was originally land owned by local farmers. Currently, debates in South African politics over land ownership and environmental sustainability are shaping who gets to control the land. The nature reserve was initially conceived to protect one of the last known coastal forests in South Africa, and also because farming practices were believed to be destroying the local ecosystem.

See also 
 South African National Parks
 Protected areas of South Africa

References

External links
 Eastern Cape Parks

Eastern Cape Provincial Parks
Protected areas of the Eastern Cape